Slade Bay - marked on Ordnance Survey maps as "The Sands" - is a sandy beach near the village of Slade, south Wales.  It is set in a relatively inaccessible location - being reachable only on foot and climbing over some large rocks.  At the back of the beach, worked fields and steep gorse-clad cliffs are visible.

Bays of the Gower Peninsula